Lebanese Chileans, are immigrants to Chile from Lebanon. Most are Christian and they arrived in Chile in the mid-19th to early-20th centuries to escape from poverty.
Ethnically Lebanese Chileans are often called "Turks", (Spanish: Turcos) a term believed to derive from the fact that they arrived from present day Lebanon, which at that time was occupied by the Ottoman Turkish Empire.  Most arrived as members  of the Eastern Orthodox church and the Maronite church, but became Roman Catholic.  A minority are Muslim.

The Greek Orthodox Christians built  in 1917. It is a cathedral of the Church of Antioch with six parishes.

See also
 Chile–Lebanon relations
 Immigration to Chile
 Lebanese diaspora

References

External links
Unión General de Estudiantes Palestinos de Chile
Comerciante palestino en Patronato An article from the Corporación del Patrimonio Cultural de Chile.

Arab Chilean
Ethnic groups in Chile
 
Lebanese diaspora in South America
Chile